Beylik of Çubukoğulları (literally "sons of Çubuk") was a small and short-lived principality in East Anatolia, Turkey between 1085 and 1112.

Çubuk was a commander in the Seljuk army. After the battle of Malazgirt in 1071, he fought in East Anatolia and was tasked with capturing the important fort of Harput (modern Elazığ). He captured the fort and continued making conquests in the surrounding area. He founded a principality under the suzerainty of the Seljuk Empire that included Palu, Genç, Çemişgezek, and Eğin (modern Kemaliye).

Çubuk was succeeded by his son Mehmet after 1092. After Mehmet's death in 1112 or 1113, the beylik was incorporated into the realm of Artuqids.

References 

 

States and territories established in 1085
1112 disestablishments
States in medieval Anatolia
Turkic dynasties
Seljuk dynasty
History of Elazığ
History of Tunceli Province
History of Bingöl Province